Panagiotis "Taki" Theodoracopulos (born 11 August 1936) is a Greek journalist and writer. He has lived in New York City, London, and Gstaad.

Early life and education
The son of a Greek shipping magnate, Theodoracopulos was privately educated in the United States at Lawrenceville School and Blair Academy before attending the University of Virginia.

Theodoracopulos was a sportsman early in life. He represented Greece at the FIS Nordic World Ski Championships 1962, having been a tennis player beforehand, including playing at the 1961 French Championship.

Career
Theodoracopulos's column "High Life" has appeared in British weekly The Spectator since 1977, where he wrote a series of controversial articles, including one claiming that black people had lower IQs than other people, for which Boris Johnson, made editor in 1999, later apologised. He has also written for other US and UK publications. In 1984, he was arrested for the possession of cocaine, after attempting to board a plane at Heathrow Airport, and served three months in HMP Pentonville. He documented his prison experiences in Nothing to Declare: Prison Memoirs (1991) and discussed them in an extended appearance on the British television programme After Dark.

In 2002, Theodoracopulos founded The American Conservative magazine with Pat Buchanan and Scott McConnell. He was also the publisher of the British magazine Right Now! He currently publishes and writes for Taki's Magazine. In 2016, the organization Proud Boys was launched with an article in Taki's Magazine by Gavin McInnes.

Theodoracopulos appeared in the 2013 James Toback film Seduced and Abandoned as himself.

He received criticism for writing in support of Greek ultranationalist political party Golden Dawn, describing them as "good old-fashioned patriotic Greeks" in a 2013 editorial. The editor of The Spectator, Fraser Nelson, defended Taki by tweeting that "Our readers like diversity and well-written pieces that they disagree with. We have no party line." In a 2021 interview, months after many Golden Dawn leaders were convicted by Greek courts for heading a criminal organisation, the chairman of The Spectator, Andrew Neil, who does not have influence over the magazine editorially, condemned the column, stating it was "beyond the pale". He further added that he had requested the editor to inform Taki that he should not return to that topic following its publication.

His frequent criticism of Israel led Conrad Black to accuse him of antisemitism. In 2018, he wrote an article commemorating D-Day in which he praised the Wehrmacht and asked readers to sympathize with them.

Racism

Taki has expressed racist views, directed against West Indians, Puerto Ricans, and Jews, among others. He has been accused of using the racial epithets "nigger" and "Sambo" to describe black people and he referred to Saudi royal family members as "ruling towelheads".

In 2003, he and the then Spectator editor Boris Johnson were investigated by the Metropolitan Police in London after publishing an allegedly racist article attacking black lawyer and political activist Peter Herbert, which led to death threats being made against Herbert. In the article he also expressed his fondness for anti-immigration politician Enoch Powell, criticising West Indian immigration to the UK and complaining "The rivers of blood speech by Enoch was prophetic as well as true and look what the bullshitters of the time did to the great man."

Personal life
Theodoracopulos has an interest in Asian martial arts, and holds a black belt in karate. He owned a 37.5-metre yacht named Bushido that was put up for sale in 2012.

Bibliography

 Taki and Jeffrey Bernard, High Life, Low Life, introduction by Richard West, edited by Cosmo Landesman.  London: Jay Landseman, 1981.  
 Taki, Princes, Playboys & High-Class Tarts, foreword by Tom Wolfe, illustrations by Blair Drawson.  Princeton: Karz-Cohl Publishers, 1984.  
 Taki, High Life, selected by Andrew Cameron, illustrated by Michael Heath.  London: Viking, 1989. 
 Taki, Nothing to Declare: Prison Memoirs, London: Viking, 1991.  
 Glass, Charles (ed.), Taki: The Spectator Columns, 2001–2009, London, Quartet, 2010.

References

External links

 Taki's Magazine
 

1936 births
Living people
Blair Academy alumni
Greek expatriates in Switzerland
Greek expatriates in the United Kingdom
Greek expatriates in the United States
Greek journalists
Place of birth missing (living people)
Greek socialites
New York Press people
Alumni of Institut Le Rosey
People from Gstaad
Racism in the United Kingdom
The Spectator people
People convicted of drug offenses
University of Virginia alumni